Baloda is a town and a nagar panchayat in Janjgir-Champa district in the Indian state of Chhattisgarh.

Geography
Baloda is located at  Baloda of Janjgir District . It has an average elevation of 280 metres (918 feet).

Demographics
 India census, Baloda had a population of 13,630. Males constitute 51% of the population and females 49%. Baloda has an average literacy rate of 66%, higher than the national average of 59.5%; with 59% of the males and 41% of females literate. 14% of the population is under 6 years of age.

References

Cities and towns in Janjgir-Champa district